Abdi Fufa (born 27 September 1995) is an Ethiopian long-distance runner. 
He competed in the senior men's race at the 2019 IAAF World Cross Country Championships held in Aarhus, Denmark. He finished in 15th place.

References

External links 
 

Living people
1995 births
Place of birth missing (living people)
Ethiopian male long-distance runners
Ethiopian male cross country runners
20th-century Ethiopian people
21st-century Ethiopian people